Lee Se-Yeol (born October 15, 1990 in Jeollanam-do) is an amateur South Korean Greco-Roman wrestler, who played for the men's light heavyweight category. In 2010, Lee defeated Japan's Norikatsu Saikawa for the gold medal in his respective division at the Asian Wrestling Championships in Delhi, India, and eventually captured a silver at the Asian Games in Guangzhou, China, losing out to Iran's Taleb Nematpour.

Lee represented South Korea at the 2012 Summer Olympics in London, where he competed for the men's 84 kg class. He lost the qualifying round match to Bosnian-born Austrian wrestler Amer Hrustanović, who was able to score four points in two straight periods, leaving Lee without a single point.

He competed in the 97kg event at the 2022 World Wrestling Championships held in Belgrade, Serbia.

References

External links
Profile – International Wrestling Database
NBC Olympics Profile

1990 births
Living people
Olympic wrestlers of South Korea
Wrestlers at the 2012 Summer Olympics
Wrestlers at the 2010 Asian Games
Asian Games medalists in wrestling
Sportspeople from South Jeolla Province
Wrestlers at the 2014 Asian Games
South Korean male sport wrestlers
Asian Games silver medalists for South Korea
Medalists at the 2010 Asian Games
Medalists at the 2014 Asian Games
Asian Wrestling Championships medalists
21st-century South Korean people